

Non-avian dinosaurs

References

1870s in paleontology
Paleontology, 1872 In